Santiago Cavanagh (born 2 August 1985) is a Bolivian swimmer. He competed in the men's 50 metre breaststroke event at the 2017 World Aquatics Championships. In 2019, he represented Bolivia at the 2019 World Aquatics Championships held in Gwangju, South Korea and he competed in the men's 50 metre breaststroke and men's 100 metre breaststroke events.

References

1985 births
Living people
Bolivian male swimmers
Place of birth missing (living people)
Swimmers at the 2019 Pan American Games
Male breaststroke swimmers
Pan American Games competitors for Bolivia
21st-century Bolivian people